EcoEléctrica is a Puerto Rican energy corporation headquartered in Peñuelas, Puerto Rico. Since the 2000s, EcoElectrica has the exclusive right to ship liquefied natural gas to Puerto Rico. Its main shareholder is GasNatural Fenosa.

History
In June 2008, EcoEléctrica started the environmental impact assessment of the LNG terminal modification project, including construction and operation of natural gas pipeline facilities.

Activities
It owns and operates a liquefied natural gas regasification terminal with a storage tank of 160,000 cubic meters in Punta Guayanilla, Peñuelas.  The power generated by EcoEléctrica is transmitted to the Puerto Rico Electric Power Authority (PREPA) operated power grid.  Steam generated by the waste heat from exhaust gasses is used in both a Toshiba-supplied steam turbine and a desalination plant.

See also
 Puerto Rico – Virgin Islands pipeline

References

External links
Corporate website

Electric power companies of Puerto Rico
Natural gas companies of Puerto Rico
Liquefied natural gas terminals
Water supply and sanitation in Puerto Rico